The Royal Parish and National Shrine of Saint Michael and the Archangels, also known as San Miguel Church, is a Catholic church of the Latin Rite dedicated to the archangels, namely, Saint Michael, Saint Gabriel, Saint Raphael .

Its current location on the corner of Jose Laurel Street and General Solano Street in the San Miguel district was once the site of La Fábrica de Cerveza de San Miguel (now San Miguel Brewery).

The shrine is also known as Malacañang Church as it is within the Malacañang Palace complex, the official residence of the President of the Republic of the Philippines. Presidents that have heard Mass at the shrine include Carlos P. García, Gloria Macapagal Arroyo, and Fidel V. Ramos (who was Protestant).

San Miguel Church has around 1,500 regular parishioners, some of whom are descended from old, rich families in the district. It is also notably the only Catholic church in the country where priests (instead of bishops) have canonical dispensation to administer the Sacrament of Confirmation twice a week.

History

San Miguel Church was first built in stone in 1603 by the Jesuits in Paco, Manila (formerly known as Dilao). In the 17th and early 18th centuries, there was an increase in the number of Japanese expatriates in that area, where they established a community. In 1611, the Jesuits and Filipino Catholics accommodated the Japanese Christians who were persecuted by the Tokugawa Shogunate. It was Blessed Dom Justo Takayama (高山右近), a daimyō or feudal lord, who led a group of approximately 300 Japanese Christians to the Philippines in 1614. According to some sources, the parish was named after Saint Michael, because most of the Japanese who arrived were of the samurai or warrior class.

The church was damaged in the 1645 Luzon earthquake, and during the British occupation of Manila that was part of the Seven Years' War. The church was rebuilt in 1913 on its present site through the generous assistance of Doña Margarita Róxas de Ayala.

The church served as the pro-cathedral of the Archdiocese of Manila while Manila Cathedral was being rebuilt from 1946 to 1958 following the city's destruction in World War II. It was elevated to the rank of a national shrine in 1986. The church follows European Baroque architecture and features symmetrical bell towers.

Notable events

On May 1, 1954, Ilocos Norte representative and later president Ferdinand E. Marcos married beauty queen Imelda Romuáldez in the shrine (at the time still the pro-cathedral). Their wedding, which followed almost two weeks of courtship, was tagged as the Wedding of the Year, with President Ramon Magsaysay standing as principal sponsor.

Archbishop Gabriel M. Reyes, the archdiocese's first Filipino ordinary who served from 1949 to 1952, was initially buried in the shrine before his remains were transferred to the crypt of Manila Cathedral. Also buried in the church are the remains of Don Domingo Róxas, patriarch of the Zóbel-de Ayala-Róxas-Soriano clans.

References

External links

Roman Catholic churches in Manila
Buildings and structures in San Miguel, Manila
Malacañang Palace
1603 establishments in the Spanish Empire
Cultural Properties of the Philippines in Metro Manila
Roman Catholic national shrines in the Philippines
Churches in the Roman Catholic Archdiocese of Manila